Ivan Seljugin (27 May 1886 Pskov Governorate, Russia – 1926) was an Estonian politician. He was a member of II Riigikogu.

References

1886 births
1926 deaths
People from Pskov Oblast
People from Pskov Governorate
Members of the Riigikogu, 1923–1926